Steve Stoyanovich (born May 2, 1957 in London, Ontario) is a Canadian former professional ice hockey player who played 23 games in the National Hockey League with the Hartford Whalers during the 1983–84 season. The rest of his career, which lasted from 1981 to 1988, was mainly spent in the Italian Serie A.

As a youth, he played in the 1969 and 1970 Quebec International Pee-Wee Hockey Tournaments with a minor ice hockey team from London.

He owns six Tim Hortons restaurants in the London, Ontario region.

Career statistics

Regular season and playoffs

References

External links
 

1957 births
Living people
Binghamton Whalers players
Calgary Cowboys draft picks
Canadian ice hockey centres
Hartford Whalers players
HC Fiemme Cavalese players
HC Gardena players
Ice hockey people from Ontario
New York Islanders draft picks
RPI Engineers men's ice hockey players
SG Cortina players
Sportspeople from London, Ontario
Canadian people of Serbian descent